Gigantea is a genus of brown alga with a single species Gigantea bulbosa.

References 

Laminariaceae
Laminariales genera
Monotypic brown algae genera